Kirill Voprosov  (born 27 March 1986) is a Russian judoka.

He won a bronze medal at the 2014 World Judo Championships in Chelyabinsk.

References

External links
 

1986 births
Living people
Russian male judoka
Universiade bronze medalists for Russia
Universiade medalists in judo
Judoka at the 2015 European Games
European Games medalists in judo
European Games bronze medalists for Russia
Medalists at the 2013 Summer Universiade